The 1915–16 Hong Kong First Division League season was the 8th since its establishment.

Overview
Royal Garrison Artillery won the title. Hong Kong West were relegated.

References
RSSSF

1915-16
1915–16 domestic association football leagues
1915 in Hong Kong
1916 in Hong Kong